Table tennis at the 2010 Commonwealth Games men's singles competition began on 9 October 2010 and concluded on 14 October. Sharath Kamal Achanta was the defending champion but lost to Yang Zi in semi-finals. Yang Zi went on to win the gold medal defeating top seed Gao Ning in final. Sharath Kamal won bronze medal by defeating compatriot Soumyadeep Roy.

Elimination rounds

First quarter

Second quarter

Third quarter

Fourth quarter

Semifinals

See also
2010 Commonwealth Games
Table tennis at the 2010 Commonwealth Games

References

Table tennis at the 2010 Commonwealth Games